As Real as It Gets is the first full-length studio album released by the metalcore band, Sworn Enemy. It was released on March 25, 2003, by Elektra Records. The title track is used in the film, The Texas Chainsaw Massacre.

Track list
All tracks by Sworn Enemy

Personnel 
 Sal Lococo - vocals
 Mike Raffinello - guitar
 Lorenzo Antonucci - guitar
 Mike Couls - bass guitar
 Paul Antignani - drums

References

External links

Sworn Enemy albums
2003 albums